René Sparenberg (December 3, 1918 – July 1, 2013) was a Dutch field hockey player who competed in the 1936 Summer Olympics. Born in Semarang, Dutch East Indies, he was a member of the Dutch field hockey team, which won the bronze medal. He played all five matches as forward.

External links
 
René Sparenberg's profile at databaseOlympics
René Sparenberg's profile at Sports Reference.com

1918 births
2013 deaths
Dutch male field hockey players
Field hockey players at the 1936 Summer Olympics
Olympic bronze medalists for the Netherlands
Olympic field hockey players of the Netherlands
People from Semarang
Olympic medalists in field hockey
Medalists at the 1936 Summer Olympics
Dutch people of the Dutch East Indies